Yordanka Peeva (born 23 April 1953) is a Bulgarian athlete. She competed in the women's javelin throw at the 1976 Summer Olympics.

References

1953 births
Living people
Athletes (track and field) at the 1976 Summer Olympics
Bulgarian female javelin throwers
Olympic athletes of Bulgaria
People from Sofia City Province